Novosergiyevsky District is an administrative and municipal district (raion), one of the thirty-five in Orenburg Oblast, Russia. It is located in the center of the oblast. Its administrative center is the rural locality (a settlement) of Novosergiyevka. Its population, 36,322 as of the (2010 Census), accounts for 37.8% of the district's total population.

Demographics
Population: 36,322 (2010 Census); 

As of the 2010 Census, the ethnic composition of the population was as follows:
Russians: 77.0%
Bashkirs: 6.8%
Tatars: 5.7%
other ethnicities: 10.5%

References

Notes

Sources

Districts of Orenburg Oblast
